The 2015 SWAC women's basketball tournament will take place March 11–14, 2015, at the Toyota Center in Houston, Texas. The tournament champion will receive the Southwestern Athletic Conference's automatic bid to the 2015 NCAA Women's Division I Basketball Championship.

Format
8 teams competed in the 2015 WBB Tournament. Texas Southern, who was the regular season champions, withdrew from the tournament after 8 players were suspended due to a season-ending brawl with Southern. Arkansas–Pine Bluff was ineligible to participate due to a low APR.

Seeds

Bracket

All times listed are Central

References

External links

SWAC women's basketball tournament
2014–15 Southwestern Athletic Conference women's basketball season